Whatever You Say, Say Nothing may refer to:

 "Whatever You Say, Say Nothing", a ballad by Colum Sands
 Whatever You Say, Say Nothing, a 1993 album by Deacon Blue
 "Whatever You Say, Say Nothing", the title of a poem by Irish Nobel laureate Seamus Heaney from his collection North (1975)